The St. Louis Southwestern Railway (Cotton Belt Route) Steam Locomotive #336 is a historic railroad steam locomotive, located at the Arkansas Railroad Museum in Pine Bluff, Arkansas. It is a Class D3 2-6-0 Mogul-style locomotive, built in 1909 by the Baldwin Locomotive Works in Philadelphia, Pennsylvania. She served on the St. Louis Southwestern Railway (aka the Cotton Belt Route) until 1947, and served industrial customers until 1963. It was placed on display in Lewisville, Arkansas until 1994, when it was donated to the museum. It is the last remaining 330-series locomotive (of ten) used by the Cotton Belt.

The locomotive was listed on the National Register of Historic Places in 2007.

See also
National Register of Historic Places listings in Jefferson County, Arkansas

References

Arkansas Railroad Museum
2-6-0 locomotives
Baldwin locomotives
Buildings and structures completed in 1909
Individual locomotives of the United States
National Register of Historic Places in Pine Bluff, Arkansas
Railway locomotives introduced in 1909
Railway locomotives on the National Register of Historic Places in Arkansas
Standard gauge locomotives of the United States
St. Louis Southwestern Railway

Preserved steam locomotives of Arkansas